Wilsonville is a village in Furnas County, Nebraska, United States. The population was 93 at the 2010 census.

History
Wilsonville was first settled in 1872 under the name “Wild Turkey”. A post office was established on April 18th of 1873. On December 16th, 1873 the name was officially changed from Wild Turkey to Wilsonville in honor of L.M. and Carlos Wilson, two brothers that were merchants and stockman.

Geography
Wilsonville is located at  (40.111551, -100.107680).

Demographics

2010 census
As of the census of 2010, there were 93 people, 45 households, and 31 families residing in the village. The racial makeup of the village was 96.8% White, 1.1% Native American, 1.1% Asian, and 1.1% from two or more races. Hispanic or Latino of any race were 2.2% of the population.

There were 45 households, of which 20.0% had children under the age of 18 living with them, 68.9% were married couples living together, and 31.1% were non-families. 31.1% of all households were made up of individuals, and 8.9% had someone living alone who was 65 years of age or older. The average household size was 2.07 and the average family size was 2.55.

The median age in the village was 54.1 years. 17.2% of residents were under the age of 18; 1.2% were between the ages of 18 and 24; 15% were from 25 to 44; 43% were from 45 to 64; and 23.7% were 65 years of age or older. The gender makeup of the village was 50.5% male and 49.5% female.

2000 census
As of the census of 2000, there were 118 people, 57 households, and 34 families residing in the village. The population density was 440.1 people per square mile (168.7/km). There were 91 housing units at an average density of 339.4 per square mile (130.1/km). The racial makeup of the village was 97.46% White, 0.85% Native American, 1.69% from other races. Hispanic or Latino of any race were 1.69% of the population.

There were 57 households, out of which 22.8% had children under the age of 18 living with them, 54.4% were married couples living together, 7.0% had a female householder with no husband present, and 38.6% were non-families. 36.8% of all households were made up of individuals, and 14.0% had someone living alone who was 65 years of age or older. The average household size was 2.07 and the average family size was 2.69.

In the village, the population was spread out, with 22.0% under the age of 18, 2.5% from 18 to 24, 23.7% from 25 to 44, 35.6% from 45 to 64, and 16.1% who were 65 years of age or older. The median age was 47 years. For every 100 females, there were 110.7 males. For every 100 females age 18 and over, there were 104.4 males.

As of 2000 the median income for a household in the village was $32,500, and the median income for a family was $37,500. Males had a median income of $26,875 versus $22,917 for females. The per capita income for the village was $17,863. There were 5.6% of families and 6.7% of the population living below the poverty line, including 5.0% of under eighteens and none of those over 64.

Notable person
 Alvin Lee Marts - USS Marts (DE-174) named for him.

References

Villages in Furnas County, Nebraska
Villages in Nebraska